Tinsel Korey (born March 25, 1980) is a Canadian actress and singer-songwriter. She is best known for portraying Emily Young in The Twilight Saga film series.

Life and career

Prior to moving to Vancouver, Korey had already appeared in some ads. She then decided in late 2002 to move to Hollywood, but was "stopped at the border because she couldn't prove she was going to come back to Canada. She couldn't go home though so she called her friend and got on a flight to Vancouver and she's been there ever since."

In 2006, Korey was given a small role as a rape victim opposite Callum Keith Rennie in the film Unnatural & Accidental, which told the story of a series of murders of mostly First Nations women. The film's director, Carl Bessai, recalled: "It was one of her first gigs and it was harrowing. She was terrified and Callum is so method, so intense. It was one of those moments where you watch a young actor and you think, 'This will either really give them the power to act or it will just alienate them.'"

Korey performed as a singer at the 2008 National Aboriginal Achievement Awards.

Korey currently lives in Los Angeles.

Filmography

Film

Television

References

External links
 

1980 births
Living people
Actresses from Toronto
Canadian film actresses
Canadian television actresses
Canadian women singer-songwriters